The football competition at the 1992 Summer Olympics featured 16 national sides from the six continental confederations. The 16 teams were drawn into four groups of four and each group played a round-robin tournament. At the end of the group stage, the top two teams advanced to the knockout stage, beginning with the quarter-finals and culminating with the gold medal match at Camp Nou on 8 August 1992.

For the first time, an age limit has been set for participants under the age of 23, which has been used ever since. 

Spain became the first host country to win the gold medal in an Olympic football tournament since Belgium in 1920, an achievement which would not be repeated again until Brazil won it in 2016. As of 2023, Spain is still the last European side that won the gold medal at men's football event in the Summer Olympics.

Notably, these were the first matches played with football's new back-pass rule and was the last Olympic football competition which was open to men only before the introduction of a women’s tournament four years later.

Competition schedule

Source:

Qualification

The following 16 teams qualified for the 1992 Olympic men's football tournament:

Venues

Match officials

Africa
  Mohamed Sendid
  Lim Kee Chong

Asia
  Kiichiro Tachi
  Ali Bujsaim

South America
  Márcio Rezende de Freitas
  José Torres Cadena
  Juan Francisco Escobar

North and Central America
  Arturo Brizio Carter
  Arturo Angeles

Europe
  Lube Spassov
  Philip Don
  Markus Merk
  Fabio Baldas
  Manuel Díaz Vega

Squads

Group stage

Group A

Group B

Group C

Group D

Knockout stage

Quarter-finals

Semi-finals

Bronze medal match

Gold medal match

Medal winners

 Gold medalists – 
José Amavisca Rafael Berges Santiago Cañizares Abelardo Fernández Albert Ferrer Pep Guardiola Miguel Hernández Toni Jiménez Mikel Lasa Juanma López Javier Manjarín Luis Enrique Kiko Alfonso Pérez Antonio Pinilla Paco Soler Gabriel Vidal Roberto Solozábal David Villabona Paqui

Coach: Vicente Miera

 Silver medalists – 
Dariusz Adamczuk Marek Bajor Jerzy Brzęczek Marek Koźmiński Dariusz Gęsior Marcin Jałocha Tomasz Łapiński Tomasz Wałdoch Aleksander Kłak Andrzej Kobylański Ryszard Staniek Wojciech Kowalczyk Andrzej Juskowiak Grzegorz Mielcarski Piotr Świerczewski Mirosław Waligóra Dariusz Koseła Arkadiusz Onyszko Dariusz Szubert Tomasz Wieszczycki

Coach: Janusz Wójcik

 Bronze medalists – 
Joachim Yaw Acheampong Simon Addo Sammi Adjei Maxwell Konadu Mamood Amadu Isaac Asare Frank Amankwah Nii Lamptey Bernard Aryee Kwame Ayew Mohammed Gargo Mohammed Kalilu Ibrahim Dossey Samuel Osei Kuffour Samuel Kumah Anthony Mensah Alex Nyarko Yaw Preko Shamo Quaye Oli Rahman

Coach: Sam Arday

Goalscorers
With seven goals, Poland's Andrzej Juskowiak was the top scorer of the tournament. In total, 87 goals were scored by 57 different players, with two of them credited as own goals.

7 goals
 Andrzej Juskowiak
6 goals
 Kwame Ayew
5 goals
 Kiko
4 goals
 Wojciech Kowalczyk
2 goals

 Tony Vidmar
 John Markovski
 Hernán Gaviria
 Hady Khashaba
 Alessandro Melli
 Francisco Rotllán
 Ryszard Staniek
 Abelardo Fernández
 Rafael Berges
 Jonny Rödlund
 Tomas Brolin
 Steve Snow

1 goal

 Carl Veart
 Damian Mori
 Shaun Murphy
 Zlatko Arambasic
 Víctor Aristizábal
 Víctor Pacheco
 Claus Thomsen
 Ibrahim El-Masry
 Mohamed Youssef
 Isaac Asare
 Mohammed Gargo
 Oli Rahman
 Demetrio Albertini
 Jung Jae-kwon
 Seo Jung-won
 Ali Marwi
 Jorge Castañeda
 Ahmed Bahja
 Noureddine Naybet
 Carlos Gamarra
 Francisco Arce
 Jorge Campos
 Mauro Caballero
 Grzegorz Mielcarski
 Marcin Jałocha
 Marek Koźmiński
 Mahmoud Soufi
 Mubarak Mustafa
 Alfonso Pérez
 Paco Soler
 Pep Guardiola
 Luis Enrique
 Roberto Solozábal
 Håkan Mild
 Patrik Andersson
 Dario Brose
 Erik Imler
 Joe-Max Moore
 Manuel Lagos

Own goals
 Shaun Murphy (playing against Poland)
 Joachim Yaw Acheampong (playing against Paraguay)

Final ranking

References

External links

Olympic Football Tournament Barcelona 1992, FIFA.com
RSSSF Summary
FIFA Technical Report (Part 1), (Part 2), (Part 3) and (Part 4)

 
1992 Summer Olympics events
1992
Football in Barcelona
Olympics
1992
oly